Brice Hortefeux (born 11 May 1958) is a conservative French politician.  He was Minister of the Interior, Overseas Territories and Territorial collectivities. He was previously Minister for Labour, Labour Relations, the Family, Solidarity and Urban Affairs and Minister-Delegate for Local Government at the Ministry of the Interior and was a Member of the European Parliament.

Early life and education
Hortefeux was born in Neuilly-sur-Seine, Hauts-de-Seine but was raised in Auvergne. 

 Degree in private law (1982)
 Master's degree in public law (1984)
 Studied at Sciences Po

Political career

Early beginnings
 Local authority administrator (1986–1994) (worked in Neuilly-sur-Seine for mayor Nicolas Sarkozy)
 Regional councillor of Auvergne : Since 1992. Reelected in 1998, 2004, 2010.
 Prefect, given responsibility for a government public service mission (1995)
 Special adviser in the office of the President of the Senate (1998–1999)
 Head of office of the Minister for the Budget and Communications and government spokesman (1993–1995)

Career in government
Minister of the Interior, Overseas, Local Authorities and Immigration : 2010–2011.
Minister of the Interior, Overseas and Local authorities : 2009–2010.
Minister of Labor, Family and Social Affairs, Solidarity and the City : January–June 2009.
Minister for Immigration, Integration, National Identity and Development Solidarity : 2007–2009.
Minister of Territorial collectivities : 2005–2007.

Hortefeux is considered one of the most loyal political allies, and personal friend, of French president Nicolas Sarkozy. He is the godfather of one of Nicolas Sarkozy's sons.

On 18 May 2007, he was appointed as the first Minister of Immigration, Integration, National Identity and Cooperative Development in the government of Prime Minister François Fillon. As such he has boosted the numbers of illegal immigrants forcibly repatriated from France, extended the network of detention centres (established also outside the larger conurbations in smaller cities such as Blois) and modified the rights of individuals and organizations which visit them.

He is in favor of controls on immigration. He was the promoter of a law that toughens conditions of political asylum in France. He believes that France has a right to expel or welcome immigrants on a discretionary basis, citing as evidence the high unemployment and criminality rates of foreigners. He also points to the geographical concentration of foreigners in a small number of towns as evidence that they are not integrated in the country. As he declared in the newspaper Le Parisien on 8 November 2007:
"France has the right to choose which immigrants it can accommodate... Let's muster the courage to face our problems! Do you find it normal that 60% of immigrants are concentrated in only 3 of our 22 regions? That the unemployment rate of these people is 22% and that their children are dropping out of school? No, we will not accept this.".

On M6's TV show Capital, when asked if there were illegal immigrants in France, he replied: "If you dream of a country where there are only honest and clean citizens... In reality, it's a constant struggle."

In August 2010 following an earlier fatal incident involving travellers and gendarmerie at Thésée, near St. Aignan, Loir et Cher, Hortefeux has vigorously pursued a policy of destroying illegal travellers' camps and imposing conditions for voluntary repatriations of Roma (or gypsies) to Romania and Bulgaria, a considerable number of which are in progress. A circular emanating from his office (chief of staff : Michel Bart) on 5 August 2010, specifically mentioning an ethnic criterion for these deportations provoked the ire of ministerial colleagues such as Éric Besson and the European commissioner, Viviane Reding. An eirenic exchange with Cardinal André Vingt-Trois, the President of the French Bishops' Conference, representing contrasting reactions within the Catholic community, also ensued.

Member of the European Parliament
Hortefeux served as a Member of European Parliament from 1999 to 2005 and again from 2011. He was first elected in 1999 and later reelected in 2004 and 2009. As member of the Union for a Popular Movement, he was part of the European People's Party group. During his time at the European Parliament, he sat on the Committee on International Trade, was a substitute for the Committee on Budgets and was a member of the delegation for relations with the Maghreb countries and the Arab Maghreb Union.

As part of a reorganization of the UMP's leadership under their chairman Jean-François Copé in January 2013, Hortefeux became – alongside Christian Estrosi, Henri de Raincourt, Jean-Claude Gaudin, Roger Karoutchi and Gérard Longuet – one of the party’s six vice-presidents.

Ahead of the 2022 presidential elections, Hortefeux publicly declared his support for Valérie Pécresse as the Republicans’ candidate and joined her campaign team as special adviser on institutional reform.

Political positions
Hortefeux is a supporter of immigrant repatriation from France. He has supported and incentivised voluntary return, in his role as Immigration Minister of France, for immigrant families. In 2007, enhancing the offer to €6,000 per family to leave the country, he claimed that the French government "must increase this measure to help voluntary return".

Controversy
On 10 September 2009, Le Monde disclosed a video showing Hortefeux at the UMP Summer School in Seignosse, France, on Saturday, 5 September 2009. As he posed for a photograph with a young man of Arabic origin, the following conversation can be heard (translation):

Female voice – He is Catholic, he eats pork and drinks beer!
Hortefeux – Oh really? Well, he does not match the prototype at all! 
Female voice – He is one of us... he is our little Arab.
Hortefeux – We always need one! When there is only one, it's okay. It's when there are many that problems begin.

In June 2010, a French court found Hortefeux guilty of a racial insult, and fined him 750 euros with an order to donate 2,000 euros to an anti-racism group. Hortefeux' lawyer said that they would appeal the ruling.

2010 cargo plane bomb plot 

On 4 November 2010, Hortefeux said that one of the two bombs in the 2010 cargo plane bomb plot was defused just 17 minutes before it was set to explode.

See also
 Alleged Libyan interference in the 2007 French elections

References

External links
 
 Declaration of financial interests (in French; PDF file)
 Police question Sarkozy's former interior minister, Brice Hortefeux  RFI English

1958 births
Living people
People from Neuilly-sur-Seine
Rally for the Republic politicians
Union for a Popular Movement politicians
The Republicans (France) politicians
The Strong Right
French interior ministers
French Ministers of Overseas France
MEPs for France 1999–2004
MEPs for Massif-central–Centre 2004–2009
MEPs for Massif-central–Centre 2009–2014
MEPs for Massif-central–Centre 2014–2019
MEPs for France 2019–2024
The Republicans (France) MEPs
Saint-Jean de Passy alumni
Paris Nanterre University alumni
Sciences Po alumni
Regional councillors of Auvergne-Rhône-Alpes
French politicians convicted of crimes